Finland was represented by Vesa-Matti Loiri and the song "Huilumies" at the 1980 Eurovision Song Contest, which took place on 19 April in The Hague.

Before Eurovision
The Finnish national selection consisted of a semi final and a final.

Semi final
The semi final was held on 12 January. The semi final had 11 competing songs and six finalists were chosen by an expert jury. The semi final was hosted by Heikki Harma.

Final
The final was held on 8 May at the YLE TV Studios in Tampere and hosted by Mikko Alatalo and the entries competing for Eurovision is conducted by Ossi Runne. After the Eurovision Preselection, this was proceeded by Intervision. The Intervision Preselection would be the last preselection, in which 6 songs are all sung by Marion. The winner was chosen by regional juries.

Scoreboard

At Eurovision
On the night of the final Loiri performed 10th in the running order following Switzerland and preceding Norway. The Finnish entry was conducted by Ossi Runne. Finland placed last in the contest with six points.

Voting

Sources
Viisukuppila - Muistathan: Suomen karsinnat 1980 
Finnish national final 1980 on natfinals

External links
Full national semi final and final on Yle Elävä Arkisto 

1980
Countries in the Eurovision Song Contest 1980